Alana Simone Cook (born April 11, 1997) is an American professional soccer player who plays as a defender for NWSL club OL Reign and the United States national team.

Early life
Born in Worcester, Massachusetts and raised in Worcester and Far Hills, New Jersey, Cook attended The Pennington School, a boarding school in Pennington, New Jersey, where she helped guide the varsity soccer team to regional  and state titles. She was named 2013 New Jersey Prep Player of the Year and 2015 NSCAA High School Scholar Player of the Year.

Twice named NSCAA Youth All-American, Cook played in the NSCAA High School All-America Game and earned Best XI honors. She played club soccer for Match Fit Academy Colchesters and won the 2013 U.S. Youth Soccer National League title with the team.

Cook began representing the United States on its youth national teams as a teenager.

Stanford Cardinal
Cook attended the Stanford University from 2015 to 2018 where she earned a degree in symbolic systems and was a four year starter for the Stanford Cardinal women's soccer team. She captained the team in her final two seasons. She was named Pac-12 Conference Defender of the Year and a MAC Hermann Trophy semifinalist in 2018.

Club career

Paris Saint-Germain, 2019–21
In January 2019, Cook elected to forgo the 2019 NWSL College Draft despite her first round draft grade and instead chose to pursue opportunities in Europe, signing a three-year deal with French Division 1 Féminine team Paris Saint-Germain.

OL Reign (loan), 2020
On June 16, 2020, Cook joined OL Reign on a short-term loan for the 2020 NWSL Challenge Cup.

OL Reign, 2021–
On June 7, 2021, OL Reign signed Cook to a three-year contract with an option for an extra year on a permanent transfer from PSG.

During the 2021 season, Cook was a starting defender in all 20 matches of the regular season. The Reign finished in second place during the regular season with a  record. After advancing to the NWSL Playoffs, they were eliminated by eventual champions Washington Spirit. Cook was named to the league's Best XI.

In 2022, Cook helped OL Reign finish in first place during the regular season winning the NWSL Shield.

International career
Cook is a former United States youth international having captained the United States U17s. She first made the jump to the U20 level in 2014 and the U23 level in 2017. She later captained the United States U23s in 2019.

Cook is eligible to represent England because of her British father, and she received her first senior international call-up in September 2019 as a training player for England's friendlies against Portugal and Brazil.

Cook received her first call-up to the United States national team on October 31, 2019.

Career statistics

Club

International

Honors 
Stanford Cardinal
NCAA Women's College Cup: 2017
Paris Saint-Germain
 Division 1 Féminine: 2020–21

 OL Reign
 NWSL Shield: 2022
 The Women's Cup: 2022
United States U23
Nordic Tournament: 2019

United States

 CONCACAF Women's Championship: 2022

 SheBelieves Cup: 2022, 2023
Individual
 Pac-12 Conference Defender of the Year: 2018
 MAC Hermann Trophy Semifinalist: 2018
 NWSL Best XI: 2021,2022

References

External links

 
 Alana Cook at United States Soccer Federation
Alana Cook at Paris Saint-Germain
 Alana Cook at Stanford Cardinal women's soccer
 

1997 births
Living people
Paris Saint-Germain Féminine players
Expatriate women's footballers in France
Sportspeople from Worcester, Massachusetts
American expatriate women's soccer players
Stanford Cardinal women's soccer players
United States women's under-20 international soccer players
United States women's international soccer players
Women's association football defenders
American women's soccer players
Division 1 Féminine players
OL Reign players
National Women's Soccer League players
African-American women's soccer players
21st-century African-American sportspeople
21st-century African-American women